The following lists events that happened during 1930 in Southern Rhodesia.

Incumbents
 Prime Minister: Howard Moffat

Events
 The Land Apportionment Act is passed and divides Southern Rhodesia into African and European areas

Births
 August 18 – John Manyarara, High Court judge (dies 2010)

Deaths

References

 
Years of the 20th century in Southern Rhodesia
Southern Rhodesia
Southern Rhodesia
1930s in Southern Rhodesia